Kosmas Mikhalopoulos (born 6 March 1966) is a Greek athlete. He competed in the men's high jump at the 1992 Summer Olympics.

References

1966 births
Living people
Athletes (track and field) at the 1992 Summer Olympics
Greek male high jumpers
Olympic athletes of Greece
Place of birth missing (living people)
20th-century Greek people